Sarkad is a town in Békés County, Hungary.

Location
 on the right bank of Fekete-Körös river
 14 km north of Gyula

Twin towns – sister cities

Sarkad is twinned with:
 Baraolt, Romania
 Niestetal, Germany
 Salonta, Romania
 Snagov, Romania

Notable people
Sándor Képíró, gendarmerie captain
Loránd Kesztyűs, physician, immunologist, and pathophysiologist
Sándor Kónya, opera singer

References

External links

 in Hungarian

Populated places in Békés County